Harry Blackwell was an English professional football goalkeeper who played for Scunthorpe United, Aberdeen, Leyton Orient and Preston North End.

While at Aberdeen, Blackwell played in the club's record 13–0 win over Peterhead, wearing a waterproof coat and an umbrella borrowed from a spectator in the inclement weather.

References

Footballers from Sheffield
Association football goalkeepers
Scunthorpe United F.C. players
Aberdeen F.C. players
Leyton Orient F.C. players
Preston North End F.C. players
Scottish Football League players
English Football League players
1900 births
1956 deaths
English footballers